William Wolff was a journalist and rabbi.

William or Bill Wolff can also refer to:

William I. Wolff, developer of the colonoscope
Bill Wolff (announcer), staff announcer for WNBC and the NBC network
Bill Wolff (baseball) (1876–1943), Major League Baseball pitcher
Bill Wolff (television executive) (born 1966), vice-president at MSNBC and executive producer of The Rachel Maddow Show

See also
William Wolf (disambiguation)
William Wolfe (disambiguation)